Shibuya Peak is a rocky summit  tall on the east side of Berry Glacier, 4 miles (6 km) southeast of Demas Range, in Marie Byrd Land. It was mapped by United States Geological Survey (USGS) from surveys and U.S. Navy air photos, 1959–65. It was named by Advisory Committee on Antarctic Names (US-ACAN) for Franklin T. Shibuya, United States Antarctic Research Program (USARP) meteorologist at Byrd Station, in 1923.

Mountains of Marie Byrd Land